The Đắk Sơn Massacre was a massacre committed by the Viet Cong during the Vietnam War, in the village of Đắk Sơn, Đắk Lắk Province, South Vietnam.

Prior to the attack, earlier battles had occurred between the Viet Cong and the village defence militias. On 5 December 1967, two battalions of Viet Cong attacked Dak Son village, and after a battle with the defence militia, killed between 114 and 252 civilians in a "vengeance" attack on the hamlet of Đắk Sơn, home to over 2,000 Montagnards. The Viet Cong believed that the hamlet had at one point given aid to refugees fleeing Viet Cong forces.

Troops marched into a village near Dak Son, some of whom used flamethrowers effectively. As the Viet Cong fired their weapons, people were incinerated inside their own homes, and some who had managed to escape into foxholes in their homes died of smoke inhalation. The homes that were not destroyed by flamethrowers were destroyed with grenades, and on the way out patches of the main town were set afire. Just before they left the village, the Viet Cong shot 60 of the 160 survivors.  Most of the remaining villagers were taken hostage.

Gallery

See also

List of massacres in Vietnam
War crimes

References

Further reading
Olive-Drab. "Vietnam War Atrocities."  10 October 2007.

The VN Center Archive, "Vietnam war Atrocities".  2005.
 
 
Spector, Ronald H. After Tet: The Bloodiest Year in Vietnam. New York: Free Press, 1993.

External links

 "The Massacre of Dak Son" Time, 15 December 1967
 "Dak Son Massacre", VN Archive
 Vietnam War Atrocities Olive Drab
 Massacre at Dak Son Death in the Highlands

1967 in Vietnam
Mass murder in 1967
Massacres in 1967
Massacres committed by North Vietnam
Massacres in Vietnam
Viet Cong
December 1967 events in Asia
Communist terrorism
History of Đắk Lắk Province
Vietnam War crimes by the Viet Cong